The Municipality of Kobilje is a municipality in the traditional region of Prekmurje in northeastern Slovenia. Its seat and only settlement is Kobilje. It was formed in 1994, when it was split from the Municipality of Lendava.

References

External links

Municipality of Kobilje on Geopedia
Official site

Kobilje
1994 establishments in Slovenia